Princeton station may refer to:

Princeton station (Illinois)
Princeton station (CTA)
Princeton station (Minnesota)
Princeton station (New Jersey)